Vincenzo Chianese (born 14 January 1976) is an Italian former footballer who spent most of his career in Serie B and Lega Pro Prima Divisione (previously known as Serie C1). Chianese had a scoring ratio of 0.4 goals per game in Lega Pro Prima Divisione where he scored more than 90 goals, but just a handful in Serie B.

Biography
Born in Melito di Napoli, Chianese started his career at Atalanta Bergamo. In 1995–96 season he went on loan to Serie C1 side Casarano. In 1995, he left for Serie B side Foggia in co-ownership deal. He was bought back a year later and loaned back to Foggia. In August 1998, he left for Salernitana of Serie A. He failed to score for the team and followed the team relegated to Serie B. He just played 5 league matches in Serie B 1999–2000 before leaving on loan to league rival Fermana. In Serie B 2000–01 he scored once in 12 league matches before leaving for another league rival Pescara in January 2001. After the relegation of Pescara he joined Vicenza of Serie B, which was newly relegated from Serie A. In 2002, he was signed by Como of Serie A but left on loan to Serie C1 side Treviso before the start of the season. He returned to Como, which had been meanwhile relegated to Serie B, where he played 30 league matches and scored 1 goal. In 2004–05 season, he left for Teramo and next season for Pavia, both of them in Serie C1.

In 2006, he signed a 2-year contract with Serie C1 side Ravenna where he won the championship. In the next season he just scored 3 goals in 18 appearances, and left for Serie C1 side Arezzo in January 2008. In Lega Pro Prima Divisione 2008–09 season he scored 15 goals and helped the team reach the promotion playoffs. Where the team lost to Crotone (which later became the winner) in semifinal.

International career
He played with Italy U-18 at 1994 UEFA European Under-18 Football Championship qualification losing to Russia U-18 in the qualification playoffs.

Honours
Serie C1 (2): 2002-2003; 2006-2007

References

External links
 Profile at La Gazzetta dello Sport (2007–08) 
 Profile at AIC.Football.it 
 Profile at FIGC 

Italian footballers
Serie A players
Serie B players
Atalanta B.C. players
U.S. Salernitana 1919 players
Delfino Pescara 1936 players
L.R. Vicenza players
Como 1907 players
Treviso F.B.C. 1993 players
F.C. Pavia players
Ravenna F.C. players
S.S. Arezzo players
Association football forwards
Sportspeople from the Province of Naples
1976 births
Living people
Footballers from Campania